Fannett can refer to:

 Fannett Township, Franklin County, Pennsylvania
 Fannett, Texas